Norton Green is a small hamlet in Stoke-on-Trent. Located in the hamlet are two Primitive Methodist Chapels which were built in 1857 and 1871.

References

Villages in Staffordshire